Handan County was a county of Hebei, China, under the administration of the prefecture-level city of the same name.

Administrative divisions
Towns:
Hucun, Beizhangzhuang, Shangbi, Heshazhen, Huangliangmeng

Townships:
Sanling Township, Daizhao Township, Nanlügu Township, Nanbao Township, Jianzhuang Township, Kangzhuang Township

References

External links

County-level divisions of Hebei
Handan